Narva Kreenholm Stadium (also Kreenholm Stadium) is a multi-purpose stadium in Narva, Estonia. The stadium holds 1,065 people.

It is currently used mostly for football matches and hosts the matches of JK Narva Trans.

The stadium was the host venue for the 1996 Baltic Cup, which was won by Lithuania.

Estonia national team matches 
Narva Kreenholm Stadium has hosted two Estonia national football team matches.

References

Football venues in Estonia
Sport in Narva
Multi-purpose stadiums in Estonia
JK Narva Trans
Buildings and structures in Narva
Athletics (track and field) venues in Estonia